300 South Tryon is an office high rise in Charlotte, North Carolina. It was completed in 2017. Ground breaking was on December 15, 2014, and construction was completed on November 16, 2017. 300 South Tryon was built on the last available undeveloped lot on Tryon and was the first high-rise office building in uptown Charlotte since the end of the Great Recession. The building has 638,000 square feet of space including 22,000 square of street level retail space, which makes it the 13th largest building in Charlotte by leasable space.

Office building
In 2007, Spectrum and Cornerstone announced plans for a 32 story building on the site that would feature a mixture of retail, condos, and office space.  However, the Great Recession dissolved these plans.  An affiliate of Cornerstone Real Estate Advisors held onto the 1.6 acre property after the deal fell through.  

Babson Capital announced in May 2014 they were considering moving their headquarters from Springfield, Massachusetts to Charlotte.  The existence of Barings came in 2016 as the result of MassMutual merging four asset management companies which included Babson Capital and Baring Asset Management. Babson was then leasing 45,000 sq ft at Duke Energy Center with 140 employees located there.  The Charlotte based part of the company was the institutional debt management arm of First Union Corp, formerly Wachovia, and was acquired by Babson in 2002, at the time of acquisition the division had 17 employees. 

Babson Capital agreed to anchor the building and lease 200,000 square feet.  Some of the building's tenants include Elior North America with 13,000 square feet, Cushman & Wakefield with 16,000 square feet, Knoll Inc. with 4,000 square feet, King & Spalding with 27,000 square feet, 
Winston & Strawn with 26,000 square feet, FCA Partners with 4,000 square feet, and CapTech with 12,500 square feet

Kimpton Tryon Park
The hotel is 18 stories  with 217 rooms, 9,300 square of meeting space which includes a 4,000 square foot ballroom.  The interior a number of pieces of art and a cohesive color theme throughout the hotel.  The guests amenities being offered are a mini bar, yoga mats, and complimentary bike rentals.  It also features a rooftop bar Merchant & Trade and Italian restaurant Angeline’s both opened in November 2017.  Angeline’s features a main dinning area which seats 136, a private room which can accommodate 36, and patio dinning.  On the hotel rooftop Merchant & Trade features a 4,500 square foot bar and lounge with views of Romare Bearden Park and Truist Field.

See also
 Barings LLC
 Uptown Charlotte
 List of tallest buildings in North Carolina / the United States / the world
 List of tallest buildings in Charlotte, North Carolina

References

External links

Skyscraper office buildings in Charlotte, North Carolina
Skyscrapers in Charlotte, North Carolina
Office buildings completed in 2017